The Mylagaulidae or mylagaulids are an extinct clade of sciuromorph rodents nested within the family Aplodontiidae. They are known from the Neogene of North America and China. The oldest member is the Late Oligocene Trilaccogaulus montanensis that lived some 29 million years ago (Mya), and the youngest was Ceratogaulus hatcheri—formerly in the invalid genus "Epigaulus" —which was found barely into the Pliocene, some 5 Mya.

Systematics
Three subfamilies are recognized. The taxonomy of Galbreathia is not resolved; it might belong in Mylagaulinae, but lacks the characteristic apomorphies.

Promylagaulinae
Genus Crucimys
Genus Promylagaulus
Genus Trilaccogaulus
Genus Simpligaulus
Mesogaulinae
Genus Mesogaulus - includes Mylagaulodon
Mylagaulinae
Genus Alphagaulus (paraphyletic)
Genus Ceratogaulus - includes "Epigaulus"
Genus Hesperogaulus
Genus Mylagaulus
Genus Notogaulus
Genus Pterogaulus
Genus Umbogaulus
incertae sedis
 Genus Galbreathia - basal in Mylagaulinae?

Footnotes

References 

  (2005): The evolution of fossoriality and the adaptive role of horns in the Mylagaulidae (Mammalia: Rodentia). Proc. R. Soc. B 272(1573): 1705–1713.  PDF fulltext
  (1997): Classification of Mammals Above the Species Level. Columbia University Press. 

Prehistoric rodent families
Chattian first appearances
Zanclean extinctions